Connor Metcalfe (born 5 November 1999) is an Australian professional soccer player who plays as a central midfielder for 2. Bundesliga club FC St. Pauli.

Club career
On 18 July 2017, Metcalfe came into the Melbourne City FC squad by a scholarship. He made his first appearance coming on as a substitute in a 2–2 draw against Central Coast Mariners for Nathaniel Atkinson.

On 6 March 2021, Metcalfe scored a brace in Melbourne City's 6–0 away win over City rivals Melbourne Victory.

He was voted in the Professional Footballers Australia's A-League's Team of the Season in June 2021. In August, he was awarded the Harry Kewell Medal, the award for Australia's men's young player of the year, for the 2020–21 season.

In February 2022, it was announced Metcalfe would join 2. Bundesliga club FC St. Pauli in the summer. He agreed a three-year deal with the German side.

International career
In October 2018, Metcalfe was called up to the Australia U20 squad to compete in the 2018 AFC U-19 Championship held in Indonesia. He made his international debut for the senior national team on 7 June 2021 in a World Cup Qualifier against Chinese Taipei.

Career statistics

Club

International

Honours
Melbourne City
 A-League Premiership: 2020–21

Individual
 Harry Kewell Medal: 2021
 A-League PFA Team of the Season: 2020−21, 2021–22

References

External links
 

1999 births
Living people
Australian soccer players
Association football midfielders
Australia international soccer players
Footballers at the 2020 Summer Olympics
Olympic soccer players of Australia
A-League Men players
National Premier Leagues players
Melbourne City FC players
FC St. Pauli players
Australian expatriate soccer players
Australian expatriate sportspeople in Germany
Expatriate footballers in Germany